Death or Glory? is the seventeenth studio album by Roy Harper and was released in 1992 following the end of his nine-year relationship.

History
Harper's second marriage ended in 1992. A number of songs and spoken word tracks on Death or Glory? reflected Harper's emotional state at the time (though some were omitted from following re-releases). "She ran off with someone else," said Harper, "a violin player (Nigel Kennedy) I’d been working on an adaptation of Brahms Violin Concerto with. I was really traumatised by that. Anybody who’s been suddenly left like that will know it’s very, very traumatic. I managed to come out of it, but it took about five years. It was like a death, a loss, like being told your child’s been killed in a war. There’s no other way to describe it. When you go through that, it changes your life forever, there’s no point in not admitting it. I withdrew, retreated, became an exile".

The overseas release of the original album contained a personal advertisement from the recently separated Harper seeking a companion.

The song "Evening Star" was written for (and performed at) the wedding of Robert Plant's daughter, Carmen, to Charlie Jones on 18 May 1991.

Singles

A four-track CD single was released at the time of the album's release. The single contained the first three album tracks and an additional track, "The Methane Zone". Subsequent album re-releases now include this track.

 "Death or Glory?"
 "The War Came Home Tonight"
 "Duty"
 "The Methane Zone"

Re-releases
In 1994 the album was reissued with different artwork, and a slightly altered track listing. In 1998 it was reissued again with another (third) album cover. This version was remastered, and two tracks ("Death or Glory?" and "The Fourth World") were partially re-recorded.

Track listing
All tracks composed by Roy Harper

Death or Glory? (5:06)
The War Came Home Tonight (4:20)
Duty (1:28)
Waiting For Godot (Part Zed) (3:30)
Next To Me (3:16)
Man Kind (1:02)
The Tallest Tree (4:52)
Miles Remains (8:52)
The Fourth World (7:22)
Why? (0:45)
Evening Star (6:05)
Cardboard City (3:24)
One More Tomorrow (5:21)
The Plough (2:16)
On Summer Day (5:39)
If I Can (0:24)

1994 & 1998 CD reissues
 "Death or Glory"
 "The War Came Home Tonight"
 "Duty"
 "Waiting For Godot (Part Zed)"
 "Next To Me"
 "The Methane Zone"
 "The Tallest Tree"
 "Miles Remain"
 "The Fourth World"
 "Why?"
 "Evening Star"
 "Cardboard City"
 "One More Tomorrow"
 "On Summer Day"

Personnel
Roy Harper - guitar, vocals
Nick Harper - guitar
Tony Franklin - bass, keyboards
Steve Barnard - drums
Kate Bush  - vocals
Michael Anthony - keyboards
Gerry Fehiley - drums
Colm O'Sullivan - keyboards
Cara Mastrey - background vocals
Ray Barron - bouzouki

References

Roy Harper (singer) albums
1992 albums